Chris Kraus (born February 22, 1983) is a Canadian basketball coach who is the current head coach of the Stonehill Skyhawks men's basketball team.

Playing career
Kraus played for his father at Markham District High School before enrolling at Stonehill, where he was part of the Skyhawks' 2006 NCAA Division II Final Four team. After graduation, Kraus would play one season of professional basketball in England for London United.

Coaching career
Beginning his coaching career in Canada, Kraus joined the coaching staff at Brandon University in Manitoba for two seasons, before moving on to Acadia University for a single season. He'd return to his alma mater and join the coaching staff of his former coach David McLaughlin in 2010. In 2013, When McLaughlin joined the coaching staff at Northeastern, Kraus was elevated to head coach of the Skyhawks.

In nine seasons at the helm at the Division II level, Kraus guided Stonehill to three NCAA tournament bids, including an Elite Eight appearance in 2016. Kraus will guide the Skyhawks into NCAA Division I as the school becomes a member of the Northeast Conference for the 2022–23 season.

Head coaching record

*Season canceled due to the COVID-19 pandemic.

References

Living people
1983 births
Canadian expatriate basketball people in the United States
Canadian men's basketball coaches
Canadian men's basketball players
Stonehill Skyhawks men's basketball coaches
Stonehill Skyhawks men's basketball players
People from Markham, Ontario
U Sports coaches